Tom Freiling (born May 6, 1966 in Minneapolis, Minnesota) is an American author and publisher of books on faith, culture, and health. Freiling is the CEO of Freiling Publishing, and the founder of Xulon Press, acquired by Salem Communications in 2006.

Authorial career
In 2000 Freiling released the book Reagan's God and Country (Gospel Light), that was endorsed by the former U.S. Attorney General, John Ashcroft. It was described as “must reading for everyone interested in our nation’s past.” by Dr. Jerry Falwell The book has been placed in the Ronald Reagan Presidential Library and Museum. 2002 saw the publication of Abraham Lincoln's Daily Treasure (Revell), a daily commentary of the president's life and faith alongside the actual devotional he is purported to have used during his presidency. Freiling released a best-selling book George W. Bush on God and Country (Allegiance Press) in 2004 and the collection of spiritual principles from the life of Lincoln, Walking with Lincoln (Revell), in 2009.

In 2004 Charles Sellier's Grizzly Adams Productions used George W. Bush on God and Country, along with David Aikman's book A Man of Faith, as the bases for his award-winning television documentary George W. Bush: Faith in the White House. The film was awarded three ICVMA awards and selected for Crown Awards. It also became a part of the President Bush permanent collection at the Smithsonian Institution.

Publishing career
From 1993 to 1998, Freiling was the publisher of Creation House, part of Charisma Media (formerly Strang Communications).

From 1998 to 2002 Freiling was the Managing Director of Eagle Publishing, Inc., and in 2000 founded the Christian e-publishing firm Xulon Press in Vienna, VA.

In 2001, Freiling appeared on C-SPAN to discuss the book Mission Impeachable: The House Managers and the Historic Impeachment of President Clinton, published by his company, Allegiance Press, which he started in 2003. The same year, Allegiance Press published Thunder on the Left by Gary Aldrich and The Bush Boom written by Jerry Bowyer with a foreword by Larry Kudlow. In 2004, Freiling published Pay to the Order of Puerto Rico with Allegiance Press. The book was written by Alexander Odishelidze and Arthur B. Laffer, who was a member of Reagan's Economic Policy Advisory Board.

In 2004, Xulon Press published When Prisoners Return by Pat Nolan, which was released by The Prison Fellowship and included a foreword by Chuck Colson. The book was discussed during official Hearings at the United States Senate Committee on the Judiciary of 2009.

Freiling has represented, and published NY Times best-selling authors, including Hugh Hewitt, Michael Brown, Mark Batterson, Dan Peek, David Barton and Henry Blackaby.

Political career
Freiling served on the campaign and U.S. House of Representatives staff of James M. Inhofe (R-OK) from 1989 to 1992. He was on the 2004 founding Board of Directors of the conservative action network Grassfire.org. In February 2012 Freiling was named Executive Director of Patriot Super PAC, an independent-expenditure only committee registered with the FEC, till it closed in 2013.

Bibliography

See also
Political Action Committee
Regnery Publishing
Samaritan Fundraising
Human Events

References

Living people
1966 births
American political writers
20th-century American male writers
21st-century American male writers
American political activists
20th-century American non-fiction writers
21st-century American non-fiction writers
American male non-fiction writers
American Christian writers
People from Minnesota
Christians from Minnesota
Writers from Minnesota
Writers from Minneapolis
Book publishers (people)
American book publishers (people)